Daniela Macías Brandes (born 9 October 1997) is a Peruvian badminton player., Tokyo 2020 Olympian...

Career 
In 2013, she won the bronze medal at the Pan Am Championships in the women's doubles partnering with Dánica Nishimura, then in 2016, she won the bronze medals in the women's singles, doubles and mixed team event.

In 2013, she also won two gold medals at the XVII Bolivarian Games in the women's singles and in the mixed team event, and a bronze medal in the women's doubles partnering with Camila García. Then, in 2017, she won three gold medals at the XVIII Bolivarian Games in the women's singles, in the women's doubles partnering with Dánica Nishimura and in the mixed doubles with Mario Cuba. She also won a silver medal in the mixed team event.

Daniela is 36 times Peruvian national champion. She won 1 silver medal and 4 bronze medals in Pan Am Championships as well as 2 gold, 1 silver and 8 bronze medals in Junior Pan Am Championships. She is also 10 times South American Singles Champion and 10 times in the women doubles and mixed events.  .

In 2014, she competed at the Nanjing Youth Olympic Games.

Daniela qualified and competed in the Women Singles event in the Tokyo 2020 Olympic Games. .

Achievements

Pan Am Championships 
Women's singles

Women's doubles

South American Games 
Women's singles

Women's doubles

BWF International Challenge/Series (27 titles, 24 runners-up) 
Women's singles

Women's doubles

Mixed doubles

  BWF International Challenge tournament
  BWF International Series tournament
  BWF Future Series tournament

References

External links 

 

1997 births
Living people
Sportspeople from Lima
Peruvian female badminton players
Badminton players at the 2014 Summer Youth Olympics
Badminton players at the 2015 Pan American Games
Badminton players at the 2019 Pan American Games
Pan American Games competitors for Peru
Competitors at the 2018 South American Games
South American Games gold medalists for Peru
South American Games silver medalists for Peru
South American Games medalists in badminton
Badminton players at the 2020 Summer Olympics
Olympic badminton players of Peru
21st-century Peruvian women